Mark J. Penn (born January 15, 1954) is an American businessman, pollster, political strategist, and author.

Penn is chairman and chief executive officer of Stagwell, a marketing group created upon the merger of Stagwell Marketing Group—a private equity fund founded by Penn—and MDC Partners, of which Penn had been chief executive officer.

He was formerly chief strategy officer of Microsoft Corporation, as well as chief executive officer of Burson-Marsteller (now part of Burson Cohn & Wolfe).

Together with Douglas Schoen, he was co-founder of the polling firm PSB Research, whose clients included President Bill Clinton, British prime minister Tony Blair, and Bill Gates. Penn was a chief strategist and pollster in the Hillary Clinton 2008 presidential campaign. Penn is the author of Microtrends (2007) and Microtrends Squared (2018). Penn later became a defender of Donald Trump, opposing his impeachment, consulting on his presidential campaign, and alleging a "deep state" conspiracy against him.

Early life and education
Penn was born in New York City and raised in Riverdale. His father was a Lithuanian immigrant who died when Penn was 10 years old. He was raised by his mother Blanche, who worked as a schoolteacher. Both of his brothers credit Penn with keeping the family together after their father's death. Penn graduated from the elite Horace Mann School in New York City in 1972. He conducted his first poll, which determined that the Horace Mann faculty was more liberal than was the country at large on the issue of civil rights, when he was 13.

Penn entered Harvard University in 1972. Initially waitlisted, Penn took the train to Boston to lobby for admission. At Harvard, Penn majored in political science and, as a city editor of the Harvard Crimson, wrote and reported 99 articles. His work for the paper included reporting and analysis on the Cambridge City Council elections of 1975, the Harvard admission process, and the controversy over the proposed construction in Cambridge of the John F. Kennedy Library. Penn graduated from Harvard College in 1976. Penn and his future business partner, Doug Schoen, started Penn & Schoen – now the global market research firm Penn, Schoen & Berland Associates – in their dorm room.

Early political campaigns

Ed Koch mayoral campaign of 1977 and 1985
In the fall of 1976, while Penn was a first-year law student at Columbia University, he and his business partner Douglas Schoen became the pollsters for congressman Ed Koch's second (and first successful) run for mayor of New York City. In 1977, with the campaign against Mario Cuomo for the Democratic nomination in full swing, Penn sought a way to conduct polls more quickly than the mainframe and punched card system he and Schoen were making use of at Columbia University. He purchased a self-assembled "microcomputer" kit and created a program that could compile polls in a fraction of the time than had been done before. By creating this "overnight poll" system, Penn allowed the campaign to conduct polls to determine messages and evaluate tactics on a daily basis, a tactical advantage that contributed to Koch's eventual victory over Cuomo.

Penn also played a significant role in Koch's campaign during the 1985 New York City mayoral election, for which he and Schoen developed direct mailings, set up phone banks, organized volunteers and canvassers, and coordinated fundraising. That year, Koch won both the Democratic primary and the general election, defeating New York City Council President Carol Bellamy.

Luis Herrera Campins presidential campaign of 1978 and Latin American politics
In 1978, Penn conducted polling for the presidential campaign of Luis Herrera Campins in Venezuela. Because Venezuela did not at that time have universal phone coverage, Penn partnered with Venezuelan polling firms to go door-to-door to collect interviews. He also helped the campaign develop the slogan "Ya Basta," or "Enough," critical of the incumbent party's spending policies. Herrera carried the election by about 3%.

The election marked the beginning of Penn's successful involvement in Latin American politics. Since 1979, Penn's firm has helped elect more than a half dozen heads of state in Latin America, including Venezuela's Carlos Andrés Pérez,<ref>{{cite news| last=Hagstrom| first=Jerry| work=National Journal| date = 1989-02-11| title=Political Consultants Are Looking South}}</ref> Belisario Betancur and Virgilio Barco Vargas of Colombia, and Leonel Fernández of the Dominican Republic.

Menachem Begin campaign for prime minister of 1981
In 1981, Penn & Schoen conducted polling for Menachem Begin's campaign for re-election as Prime Minister of Israel. When Begin called the June elections in January 1981, public polls said that it was likely that his party, Likud, would win 20 seats in the Knesset to Labor's 58. A New York Times article published in March of that year stated that Begin was "probably in his final months as Prime Minister." Penn & Schoen applied the rapid polling techniques they'd developed on Ed Koch's first campaign for mayor to provide Begin with a daily understanding of attitudes of the Israeli electorate. Ultimately, Begin defeated Labor, led by Shimon Peres, by 10,405 votes out of more than 1.5 million cast.

Corporate work
In the late 1980s, Penn was the force behind his firm's drive to win corporate consulting clients. Texaco, which was experiencing image problems due to bankruptcy, was the firm's first major corporate client.

In 1993, Penn, Schoen & Berland was engaged by AT&T's new advertising agency FCB to guide a response to MCI's "Friends and Family" plan, an upstart competitor for AT&T's long-distance services. To help AT&T understand how best to counter MCI's strongest messages, Penn created the "mall testing" methodology for competitive advertising research. In the mall tests, Penn showed randomly selected mall shoppers MCI ads head-to-head with proposed new AT&T ads. Using this methodology, Penn's firm determined messages resulting in AT&T's "True" plan and its $200 million advertising campaign. As a result of this campaign, by the end of 1994, AT&T had signed up 14 million new long-distance customers.

Penn has served as a key strategic advisor to Bill Gates and Microsoft since the mid-1990s. Penn began working with Microsoft when the company faced antitrust litigation initiated by the U.S. Department of Justice. Penn also created the famous "blue sweater" advertisement that featured Bill Gates, which were intended to restore trust in the company amid the antritrust litigation. In 2006, a survey of global opinion leaders found that Microsoft was the world's most trusted company, an accomplishment which The Wall Street Journal partially attributed to Penn's advice.

His other corporate clients have included Ford Motor Company, Merck & Co., Verizon, BP, and McDonald's.

Microsoft Corporation
In July 2012, Penn was named Corporate Vice President for Strategic and Special Projects at Microsoft Corporation. Shortly after he came on board, he began a public relations campaign against Google on behalf of Bing. Just in time for the holiday shopping season, he created a commercial in which Microsoft criticized Google for biasing its shopping search results with paid advertisements. "Don't get Scroogled", the commercial warned. In August 2013, Penn was named Executive Vice President for Advertising and Strategy. In that role, he pioneered Microsoft's "Honestly" campaign 
and the award-winning Super Bowl 2014 ad "Empowering Us All". In March 2014, he was named executive vice president and chief strategy officer by chief executive officer Satya Nadella. On June 17, 2015, it was announced he would be leaving Microsoft.

 The Stagwell Group 
After leaving Microsoft, Penn founded The Stagwell Group, a private equity firm that invests in marketing services agencies with a $250 million investment from former Microsoft chief executive officer Steve Ballmer.

Penn told The Wall Street Journal that he wants to create a "more digitally-focused advertising holding group, made up of companies which do not overlap in function," and offer a "fully-integrated solution across the continuum of marketing services."

In October 2015, Stagwell Group struck a deal worth up to $75 million to buy SKDKnickerbocker. In January 2017, the Stagwell Group acquired the Harris Poll from Nielsen Holdings and renamed it Harris Insights & Analytics. The firm has also acquired National Research Group, digital creative firm Code and Theory, media agency ForwardPMX, and marketing communications companies SKDK and Targeted Victory, among others.

Stagwell Inc. 
In August 2021, Penn merged the Stagwell Group merged with MDC Partners to form Stagwell Inc.  Stagwell (Nasdaq: STGW) has offices in 35 countries and over 11,000 employees. Stagwell companies include GALE, Code and Theory, Harris Poll, Anomaly, Doner, Assembly, 72 and Sunny, etc. In February 2022, Penn announced the formation of the Stagwell Marketing Cloud.

President Bill Clinton (1994–2000)
In 1994, Penn and Schoen were asked to help President Bill Clinton recover from the Democratic Party's dramatic losses during that year's midterm elections. The pollsters urged Clinton to move to the center, emphasizing stepped-up law enforcement, balancing the budget, and other issues.

Penn served as pollster to President Clinton for six years. During that time, he became one of the president's most prominent and influential advisers. In 2000, the Washington Post concluded in a news analysis that no pollster had ever become "so thoroughly integrated into the policymaking operation" of a presidential administration as had Penn.

U.S. federal government shutdown of 1995

Beginning in August 1995, at Clinton's request, Penn conducted numerous polls to understand what the political ramifications would be if the federal government were to shut down over disagreement between the legislative and executive branches over the budget. Penn tested many different scenarios for Clinton, and in each case the research showed that the American public would back the President and blame Republicans if the government shut down. On November 14, 1995, with no budget signed, major portions of the federal government became inoperative. They were restored by the passage of a temporary spending bill a few days later, but on December 16, 1995, the federal government again shut down, this time for a period of 21 days. Ultimately, Newt Gingrich and the Republican-controlled Congress bore much of the political fallout for the shutdown, vindicating Penn's polling.

1996 presidential campaign
During President Clinton's 1996 reelection campaign, Penn used the mall tests he developed for AT&T to test presidential campaign ads. He also created the "NeuroPersonality Poll," a survey that blended standard political and demographic questions with lifestyle, attitudinal, and psychographic questions, some adapted from Myers-Briggs. Penn's 1996 Neuro Poll helped him identify a new swing voter: the "soccer mom." Previously, pollsters had thought that the defining voter variables were things such as age and income. But Penn argued that marital status was also a key defining variable. He found that the gap was even wider among voters with children at home: parents were 10–15 points more likely to lean Republican. Based on this analysis, Penn urged Clinton to focus on policies that appealed to suburban parents and to speak about these policies in terms of values rather than economics. He subsequently became famous for focusing on the soccer mom, cited as the key swing vote that helped President Bill Clinton get reelected in 1996.

Second term
After the election, and for most of the second term, Penn and Schoen were hired to conduct 2–4 White House polls per month and met weekly with the President and the White House staff in the residence to review polls and policy ideas. These polls influenced President Clinton's thinking and helped to refine his "new Democrat" language and policies that are one of his distinctive political contributions.

Impeachment trial
When allegations of President Clinton's extramarital affair with Monica Lewinsky first surfaced in January 1998, Penn conducted polls to help the administration craft its response. Penn subsequently led the research effort monitoring Clinton's level of public support throughout the impeachment and until Clinton was acquitted on February 13, 1999.

Hillary Clinton

 2000 and 2006 Senate campaigns 
In 2000, then-First Lady Hillary Clinton asked Penn to advise her on her run for the U.S. Senate from New York. During the campaign, tension brewed between Penn, who urged Clinton to focus on the issues, and other advisers, who urged Clinton to focus more on personality. Clinton followed Penn's advice and won the election. Penn served again as Clinton's pollster in her successful 2006 Senate reelection campaign.

 2008 Presidential campaign 
In 2008, he served as chief strategist to Hillary Clinton's campaign for president. Again, Penn and his colleagues held differences of opinion over how much to "humanize" Clinton, with Penn arguing that the vast majority of voters cared more about substance than style. According to New York Times columnist Frank Rich, Penn and his wife, Nancy Jacobson "helped brand the Hillary Clinton presidential campaign as a depository for special-interest contributions."

Penn laid out his "strategy for winning" in a March 19, 2007 memo to the campaign. According to the memo, Penn believed Clinton's victory would be built upon a coalition of voters he called "Invisible Americans", a sort of reprise of Bill Clinton's "forgotten middle class", which would be composed of women and lower and middle class voters. Eventually it was this coalition that she ended up winning a year later.

Penn advised Clinton not to apologize for voting for the Iraq War, insisting that "It's important for all Democrats to keep the word 'mistake' firmly on the Republicans." Clinton followed this strategy. She would only apologize six years later in 2014.

Clinton was the front-runner in the early months of the Democratic primary, but in January 2008 she lost the Iowa caucus to then-Senator Barack Obama. On April 6, 2008, Penn agreed to step down as chief strategist when it was disclosed that he met with representatives of Colombia's government to help promote a free trade agreement that Clinton had opposed. He remained doing essentially a similar role until the end of the campaign.

In May 2008, Time's Karen Tumulty wrote that Penn thought the Democratic primaries were "winner-take-all", rather than allotted proportionally, citing anonymous sources who attended a Clinton strategy session with Penn in 2007. Senior Clinton staffer Harold Ickes is reported to have asked in frustration, "How can it possibly be that the much vaunted chief strategist doesn't understand proportional allocation?" Penn and Howard Wolfson, Clinton's communication director, both denied that the scene had taken place.

Clinton's campaign was hobbled by infighting among the staff including much hostility towards Penn, and disagreement in strategy such as between Penn's strategy of going negative against Obama and other staff who wanted to maintain a positive campaign.

Tony Blair campaign for prime minister (2005)
Penn advised British prime minister Tony Blair and conducted polling during his successful campaign for an unprecedented (for a Labour leader) third term in 2005. President Bill Clinton had recommended Penn's services to British prime minister Tony Blair when they met at Ronald Reagan's funeral in 2004. Penn formulated the concept behind Blair's campaign slogan, "Forward Not Back", and refined it by conducting phone interviews with British swing voters through Penn, Schoen & Berland Associates. Blair's Labour Party bested Michael Howard's Conservative Party by 3% in the general parliamentary elections.

Microtrends
His book, Microtrends, published by Hachette with Kinney Zalesne, argues that small groups of people can trigger big changes. They argue that a mere one percent of the American public (3 million people) can create a "microtrend" capable of launching a major business or even a new cultural movement, changing commercial, political and social landscapes. From December 2008 to December 2009, Penn and Zalesne authored a regular online column for the Wall Street Journal called "Microtrends". In The New York Times, reviewer Harry Hurt III described the book as "a diligently researched tome chock-full of counterintuitive facts and findings" and "the perfect bible for a game of not-so-trivial pursuits concerning the hidden sociological truths of modern times..."."On the other hand, Ezra Klein described the book as "epically awful" and remarked that "If [Penn] is the pinnacle of his profession, then the profession uses numbers as a ruse – a superficial empiricism that obscures garden-variety hackery."

 Donald Trump relationship 
Penn has reportedly become disenchanted with the leftward shift in the Democratic Party. Philippe Reines suggested that Penn shouldered too much of the blame for Hillary Clinton's 2008 presidential defeat. Bill Clinton described Penn's recent 2018-19 commentary as "sour grapes", suggesting “[Penn] wasn’t invited back into the [2016] campaign.”

Advocacy against Trump impeachment
Penn later became a defender of Donald Trump, opposing his impeachment, consulting on his presidential campaign, and alleging a "deep state" conspiracy.

Throughout 2018 and 2019, Penn was vocal with his criticisms of Special Counsel Robert Mueller's probe into Russian interference in the 2016 election, regularly appearing on Fox News and contributing columns to The Hill in which he, in the words of Politico, "bashed" the probe and ensuing impeachment attempt.

During this period, CNN and MSNBC declined to book Penn and his frequent appearances were criticized by some who said he was seeking revenge against Democrats for saddling him with Hillary Clinton's defeat in the 2008 U.S. presidential election.The Daily Beast'' wrote in 2018 that Penn "has emerged in the last year as one of the president’s most outspoken defenders."

In an Aug. 4 2018 appearance on Fox News, Penn called Mueller's investigation into Russian collusion “a national waste of time".  Penn published several columns which criticized Special Counsel Robert Mueller and political and legal adversaries of Trump. In online opinion columns, he alleged that Mueller and "Democratic-leaning lawyers" were acting improperly in trying to prepare a charge of obstruction of justice against Trump. In these articles, Penn did not disclose that his firm had previously done work for Trump in the 1980s.

Allegations of "deep state" conspiracy
Penn has used the term "deep state" to refer to what he characterizes as Democratic operatives within the government who seek to undermine and sabotage Trump's presidency. “I’ve seen in 1998, I spent a year fighting this thing with Ken Starr and I think this thing is just plain wrong and it has got to be ended and stopped,” he told Fox News in May 2018. He has alleged that Rod Rosenstein had conflicts of interest that should have precluded his involvement in investigations into Trump.

Trump 2020 presidential campaign
Penn met with Trump in February and November 2019 to give him advice on his 2020 re-election strategy and his response to the impeachment proceedings, respectively.

Personal life
Penn is married to Nancy Jacobson, the founder and CEO of No Labels, a bipartisan political organization.

See also
 Triangulation (politics)

Notes

External links

 Official website
 

1954 births
American people of Lithuanian-Jewish descent
American political consultants
Jewish American writers
Columbia Law School alumni
Horace Mann School alumni
Living people
Microsoft employees
New York (state) Democrats
Pollsters
The Harvard Crimson people
Hillary Clinton 2008 presidential campaign